Talam may refer to:
Talam, Burma
Talam, Iran
Citalopram, an antidepressant drug
Kue talam, Indonesian traditional tray cake